Rolling Home is a 1926 silent film comedy directed by William A. Seiter and starring Reginald Denny. It was produced and distributed by Universal Pictures.

Cast
Reginald Denny - Nat Alden
Marian Nixon - Phyllis
E. J. Ratcliffe - Mr. Grubbell
Ben Hendricks Jr. - Dan Mason
Margaret Seddon - Mrs. Alden
George Nichols - Colonel Lowe
Alfred Allen - General Wade
Charles Thurston - Sheriff (as C.E. Thurston)
George F. Marion - Selectman
Alfred Knott - Selectman
Anton Vaverka - Pemberton
Howard Enstedt - Office Boy
Adele Watson - Aunt

References

External links
 Rolling Home at IMDb.com 

1926 films
American silent feature films
Films directed by William A. Seiter
American films based on plays
Universal Pictures films
American black-and-white films
Silent American comedy films
1926 comedy films
1920s English-language films
1920s American films